William Holden (20 July 1883 – 2 August 1949) was a New Zealand cricketer. He played four first-class matches for Otago between 1917 and 1919.

See also
 List of Otago representative cricketers

References

External links
 

1883 births
1949 deaths
New Zealand cricketers
Otago cricketers
Cricketers from Dunedin